Edward Blake Moore Jr. (born May 8, 1958) is a former offensive lineman in the National Football League who played for the Cincinnati Bengals and the Green Bay Packers.  Moore played collegiate ball for the College of Wooster and played professionally in the NFL for 6 seasons.  He retired in 1985.

After his playing career, he would receive a J.D. degree from Harvard Law School.

References

1958 births
Living people
Sportspeople from Durham, North Carolina
Players of American football from North Carolina
American football offensive linemen
Wooster Fighting Scots football players
Cincinnati Bengals players
Green Bay Packers players
Harvard Law School alumni